

Science and technology
 National Science Foundation of Sri Lanka, National e-Repository

University
 Open University of Sri Lanka e-Repository
 Rajarata University of Sri Lanka
 University of Colombo, Sri Lanka
 University of Moratuwa, Sri Lanka
 University of Peradeniya, Sri Lanka
 University of Ruhuna, Sri Lanka
 University of Sri Jayawardenapura Digital Repository
 University of the Visual and Performing Arts, Sri Lanka, Library e-Repository

External links
 Chanaka's Knowledge Hub
 Directory of Sri Lankan Institutional Repositories home page

Archives in Sri Lanka